The West Indian Brigade was a British Army unit during World War I.

In 1915, a second West Indies regiment was formed from Caribbean volunteers who made their way to Britain. Initially, these volunteers were drafted into a variety of units within the British Army, but in 1915 it was decided to group them together into a single regiment, named the British West Indies Regiment.

Composition
Initially it was made up of men from:
British Guiana - A Company
Trinidad - B Company
Trinidad and St Vincent - C Company
Grenada and Barbados - D Company

High wastage led to further drafts from Jamaica, British Honduras and Barbados before the regiment was able to begin training. The regiment totalled twelve battalions, and engaged in a number of roles and theatres. The regiment was finally disbanded in 1921.

Battle honours
The Great War (11 battalions): Messines 1917, Ypres 1917, Polygon Wood, Broodseinde, Poelcappelle, Passchendaele, Pursuit to Mons, France and Flanders 1916-18, Italy 1918, Rumani, Egypt 1916-17, Battles of Gaza, El Mughar, Nebi Samwil, Jerusalem, Jaffa, Battle of Megiddo 1918, Nablus, Palestine 1917-18

British West Indies
Military units and formations of the British Empire in World War I